The Dixmoor 5 are five African-American men who, as teenagers in Dixmoor, Illinois, were falsely convicted of the November 1991 rape and murder of 14-year-old Cateresa Matthews. At the time of arrest, the defendants, Robert Taylor, Jonathan Barr, James Harden, Robert Lee Veal and Shainne Sharp were all between the ages of 14 and 16.

During high-pressure interviews, three of them gave false confessions leading to convictions for all five. The teens alleged that they were coerced into confessing, claiming they were physically abused and threatened during their interrogations. One of the boys who confessed had an IQ of 56 and developmental disabilities. Two pleaded guilty and testified against the others in exchange for shorter sentences. Both men have since recanted their testimony. Each received at least 80 years in prison.

In 2011, DNA tests connected semen on Cateresa to another man, Willie Randolph, a convicted sex offender who had recently been released on parole. Randolph was later charged on September 1, 2016, for the rape and murder of Cateresa Matthews. A suit filed by the five men alleges police withheld exculpatory evidence, including the DNA, from their defense teams. Their convictions were vacated November 3, 2011, and those remaining incarcerated were released.

In 2014, they reached a wrongful conviction settlement with the state of Illinois for $40 million, the largest wrongful conviction settlement in state history.

See also
 List of wrongful convictions in the United States
 Innocence Project
 Innocent prisoner's dilemma
 Miscarriage of justice
 Overturned convictions in the United States

Notes

People from Chicago
Overturned convictions in the United States
Quantified groups of defendants
American people wrongfully convicted of murder